Oscar Abolafia (1935 - March 30, 2020) was a photographer known for his images of celebrities that appeared in many prominent magazines in the 1960s, 1970s and 1980s.

Abolafia, the descendant of a Spanish Jewish immigrant family, grew up in New York City. Abolafia and his brother Louis Abolafia came to prominence in 1968 when Louis "ran" for President of the United States as "the Naked Candidate", with Oscar providing the advertising imagery for Louis' "campaign".

Abolafia photographed the rich and famous including the Kennedy family, Andy Warhol, Michael Jackson, Elizabeth Taylor, Jack Nicholson, Audrey Hepburn, and Elvis Presley. He also worked for People Magazine, Vanity Fair and Harper’s Bazaar. He took pictures backstage at The Tonight Show and during filming of several James Bond movies and A Bridge Too Far.

In 1970 Abolafia married Joanna. They lived together in New York City.

Sources

External links 
 Official US Site
 Official Netherlands Site
 Photography Book 'Icons By Oscar'

American photographers
1935 births
2020 deaths